Gerdeh is a village in Gerdeh Rural District, in the Central District of Namin County, Ardabil Province, Iran. At the 2006 census, its population was 379, in 103 families.

References 

Towns and villages in Namin County